The Cooper 500, also referred to as the T2/T3 (Type 2/Type 3), was a prototype 500cc (predecessor to Formula 3) open-wheel racing car designed and built by the Cooper Car Company in Surbiton, Surrey, England, and was their first ever car. The first post-war prototypes were built in 1946, shortly after the end of the Second World War. Since materials were in short supply immediately after World War II, the prototypes were constructed by joining two old Fiat Topolino front-ends together. It was powered by a   JA Prestwich Industries (JAP) 4B Speedway single-cylinder motorcycle engine, which drives the rear wheels through a Triumph Speed Twin gearbox, via chain. It was succeeded by their first successful production car, the Mk.II, in 1948.

References

Cooper racing cars
1940s cars
Cars of England